Nodozana heieroglyphica is a moth of the subfamily Arctiinae. It is found from Panama to Ecuador.

References

 Natural History Museum Lepidoptera generic names catalog

Lithosiini